Lucas López may refer to:

 Lucas López (footballer, born 1994), Argentine defender
 Lucas López (footballer, born 1998), Argentine midfielder